Olivine Creek is a creek located in the Similkameen region of British Columbia.  The creek flows into the Tulameen River from the south side.  Olivine Creek is located about 3 miles up the river from the village of Tulameen, British Columbia.  Olivine Creek was originally called Slate Creek.  The Creek was discovered in 1885 and mined for gold and platinum.

References

Rivers of British Columbia